Awake Is the New Sleep is the fifth album by Australian musician Ben Lee, released in 2005. It reached #5 on the Australian ARIA Albums Chart, becoming his most successful album. It contains the top 40 singles "Gamble Everything for Love" and "Catch My Disease". "Gamble Everything for Love" was also voted number 15 in the Triple J Hottest 100, 2004 while "Catch My Disease" was #2 in the Triple J Hottest 100, 2005. The song "We're All in This Together" was used on several television advertisements in Australia and New Zealand, including Coca-Cola and The Salvation Army Community Services. It was later featured in Industry SuperFunds ad from 2016 to the present.

At the J Award of 2005, the album was nominated for Australian Album of the Year.

In October 2010, Awake Is the New Sleep was listed in the book, 100 Best Australian Albums.

Influences 
Before writing Awake Is The New Sleep, Lee traveled to India. It was here that he met Sakthi Narayani Amma, who inspired him spiritually and told him he would succeed if he put the message of joy into his music. This was a turning point for Lee. Having experienced criticism for his light heartedness in the past, Lee felt a renewed need to incorporate joy and happiness into his music. Lee also changed his reason for making music, from creating music to get something out of it to creating music as a way to give to others. All of this greatly influenced the music on Awake Is The New Sleep.

Track listing 
(all songs written by Lee except where noted)
 "Whatever It Is" – 3:18
 "Gamble Everything for Love" – 3:21
 "Begin" – 4:12
 "Catch My Disease" (Lee, McGowan Southworth) – 4:14
 "Apple Candy" – 3:22
 "Ache for You" – 4:05
 "Into the Dark" – 2:46
 "No Right Angles" – 3:34
 "Get Gotten" – 3:07
 "Close I've Come" – 3:23
 "The Debt Collectors" – 2:50
 "We're All in This Together" – 4:39
 "Light" – 9:48
 "I'm Willing" – 4:01

Credits 
 Ben Lee - vocals, guitar, bass, percussion
 Lara Meyerratken - keyboards, vocals, drums, percussion, "atmosphere"
 McGowan Southworth – guitar, vocals, keyboards, percussion
 Brad Wood - drums on tracks 2, 4 and 7; bass; drum programming; saxophone; vocals; percussion
 Jason Schwartzman - drums on tracks 10 and 13
 Eric Gardner - drums on tracks 8 and 12
 Rob Hann - bass on tracks 8 and 12
 Chick Wolverton - percussion

Party Vocals 
 Har Mar Superstar
 Jenny Lewis
 Jason Falkner
 Scarlett Chorvatt
 Melanie Sirmons
 Sam Spiegel
 Jason Boesel
 Olivia Asta Wood
 Gracie Garcia
 Katie Mulcahy

Charts

Weekly charts

Year-end charts

Certifications

References 

Ben Lee albums
2005 albums
ARIA Award-winning albums
New West Records albums
Albums produced by Brad Wood